Federalist No. 60 is an essay by Alexander Hamilton, the sixtieth of The Federalist Papers. It was published on February 23, 1788, under the pseudonym Publius, the name under which all The Federalist papers were published. This is the second of three papers discussing the power of Congress over the election of its own members. It is titled "The Same Subject Continued: Concerning the Power of Congress to Regulate the Election of Members".

In this paper, Hamilton addresses the concern that leaving the regulation of elections to the Union may favor only an elite, small class of people.

External links 

 Text of The Federalist No. 60: congress.gov

60
1788 in American law
1788 in the United States
1788 essays